Billbergia saundersii is a species of flowering plant in the genus Billbergia. This species is endemic to Brazil.

Cultivars
 Billbergia 'Aussie Rose'
 Billbergia 'Charles Dewey'
 Billbergia 'Cream Puff'
 Billbergia 'Escaffrei'
 Billbergia 'Fantasia'
 Billbergia 'Fascinator'
 Billbergia 'Gem'
 Billbergia 'Gireaudiana'
 Billbergia 'Gireondiana'
 Billbergia 'Gladly'
 Billbergia 'Hoelscheriana'
 Billbergia 'Ivey Meyer'
 Billbergia 'Joyous'
 Billbergia 'Leopoldii'
 Billbergia 'Makoyana'
 Billbergia 'Nez Misso'
 Billbergia 'Robert Saunders'
 Billbergia 'Rubro-Cyanea'

References

BSI Cultivar Registry Retrieved 11 October 2009

saundersii
Flora of Brazil